José Washington Delgado Tresierra (October 26, 1927 in Cusco – September 7, 2003 in Lima) was a Peruvian poet.

He studied at the Pontificia Universidad Católica del Perú in Lima, later pursuing his studies in literature in Madrid between 1955 and 1958.

Works 

Formas de la ausencia (1955)
 Días del corazón (1957)
 Para vivir mañana (1959)
 Un mundo dividido (1970)
 Destierro por vida (1970)
 Reunión elegida (1988)
 Historia de Artidoro (1994)
La muerte del doctor Octavio Aguilar
Historia de la literatura del Perú Republicano

External links
 Works by Washington Delgado

Peruvian male poets
1927 births
2003 deaths
People from Cusco
20th-century Peruvian poets
20th-century male writers